Xu Zengcai (born 1 October 1961) is a male Chinese former table tennis player who played at the 1988 Summer Olympics.

He is married to former teammate Chen Zihe.

References

1961 births
Living people
Table tennis players from Fujian
Chinese male table tennis players
Table tennis players at the 1988 Summer Olympics
Olympic table tennis players of China
Sportspeople from Fuzhou